Lipno  is a village in the  municipality of Ljubuški, Bosnia and Herzegovina. According to the 1991 census, the village had a population of 536, almost all ethnic Croats.

Demographics 
According to the 2013 census, its population was 223, all Croats.

References

Populated places in Ljubuški